Satyajit Mayor
(born 1963) is an Indian biologist. He serves as director of the National Centre for Biological Sciences, Bangalore. Mayor is the former director of the Institute for Stem Cell Biology and Regenerative Medicine (inStem) at Bangalore which has a focus on the study of stem cell and regenerative biology.

In 2012, Mayor won the Infosys Prize for life sciences for his study of regulated cell surface organization and membrane dynamics.

Education
Mayor studied chemistry at the Indian Institute of Technology Bombay and was awarded his PhD in life sciences from The Rockefeller University, New York. He worked as a post-doctoral fellow at Columbia University, where he developed tools to study the trafficking of membrane lipids and GPI-anchored proteins in mammalian cells using quantitative fluorescence microscopy.

Research
Mayor started his laboratory at NCBS in 1995 after the completion of his post-doctoral research at Columbia University.

"The broad aim of Prof Mayor’s laboratory is to provide an understanding of the molecular mechanisms of endocytosis in metazoan cells, and study this phenomenon at many scales. At the molecular scale his group wants to uncover the molecular players in endocytic processes; at the mesoscopic scale research in his laboratory attempts to provide a physical description of cell membrane structure and organization process and its material properties; at the cellular scale the work is aimed at synthesizing a role for endocytosis in cellular signalling and cell surface homeostasis; at the scale of the tissue the group wishes to determine how control of endocytosis impinges on many developmental programs in tissue morphogenesis (http://www.ncbs.res.in/mayor)."

Professor Mayor is the recipient of several national and international awards such as the Wellcome Trust International Senior Research Fellowship, Swarnajayanti Fellowship, Shanti Swarup Bhatnagar Award and the JC Bose Fellowship.

Awards and honors
 Elected as Foreign Associate of the US National Academy of Sciences, 2015.
 Distinguished Alumnus of IIT Bombay, 2013
 Elected EMBO Fellow, 2013
 Infosys Prize for Life Sciences, 2012
 TWAS Prize in Biology, 2010
 EMBO Global Lecturer, 2010
 JC Bose Fellowship, DST, 2006-2011 (renewed till 2016).
 Shanti Swarup Bhatnagar Award, CSIR, 2003.
 Swarnajayanti Fellowship, DST, 2003-2008.
 Wellcome Trust International Senior Research Fellow (Biomedical Research, India), 1999-2004.
 Mizutani Foundation for Glycoscience Award, 2001
 Helen Hays Whitney Post-Doctoral Fellowship, 1992-1995.
 The Rockefeller-Oxford Student Exchange Program Recipient, 1988.
 Lucille P. Markey Charitable Trust Graduate Fellowship, 1986-1991.
 Visiting Students Research Program Recipient (TIFR), 1984.

References

External links 
 
Lab Website

1963 births
Living people
Fellows of the Indian Academy of Sciences
Fellows of the Indian National Science Academy
Academic staff of the National Centre for Biological Sciences
IIT Bombay alumni
Rockefeller University alumni
TWAS laureates
Foreign associates of the National Academy of Sciences
Recipients of the Shanti Swarup Bhatnagar Award in Biological Science
Scientific American people